Luke Power (born 8 January 1980) is a former Australian rules footballer who played for the Brisbane Lions and Greater Western Sydney Giants in the Australian Football League (AFL). A member of the Brisbane Lions's 2001, 2002, and 2003 premiership winning teams, he played 282 games for the Lions before moving to Greater Western Sydney where he played his final season.

AFL career

Brisbane Lions (1998–2011)

Premiership sides (1998–2003)
Power debuted for the Lions as an 18-year-old in 1998, and he has been noted ever since for his skills and desire to win the ball. He has played in all three of Brisbane's premierships.

Leadership (2004–2009)
Power was named as a vice-captain in 2004, where he won All-Australian selection in 2004. Midway through 2005 he was out of contract and was expected to arrive at the Collingwood FC, but decided he would stay with the Brisbane Lions. He retained the position in 2005. In 2006, he was an inaugural member of the Brisbane Lions Leadership group, under captain Michael Voss. When Voss retired at the end of 2006, Power was named as co-captain of the side in 2007, alongside Black, Lappin, Chris Johnson, and Jonathan Brown. After Johnson's retirement in 2007, Power was one of four co-captains. Lappin's retirement at the end of 2008 means there was only three of the original five co-captains remaining. At the start of 2009, the new coach, Michael Voss, changed the co-captain system. Jonathon Brown was made stand-alone captain, with four vice-captains - Simon Black, Jed Adcock, Daniel Merrett and Power. In 2009, he was another consistent year for Luke Power as he led the Disposal count for the Lions with 615. He finished 4th in the Best and Fairest voting behind Mitch Clark, Simon Black and eventual winner Jonathan Brown.

End of Brisbane Lions career (2010–2011)
In Round 10 of the 2010 season, in which the Lions took on Collingwood at the Gabba, Power played his 250th game, a match where the Lions upset the eventual premiers Collingwood by eight points, giving Power the perfect celebration for his milestone. In 2011, Power remained one of only three players (the others being Simon Black  and Jonathan Brown) from the triple-premiership winning Brisbane Lions sides of 2001-2003. Luke Power retired after the Round 23 match against , having played 282 games for the Lions. His retirement was primarily due to being told that his position in the Lions side would not be guaranteed in 2012.

Greater Western Sydney (2012)

On 17 September 2011, it was announced, he would be joining Greater Western Sydney. He was made co-captain alongside Phil Davis and Callan Ward. In Round 21 of the 2012 season, Power became the 66th person to play 300 VFL/AFL games, (282 for the Brisbane Lions, 18 for GWS). Power then retired from his playing career at the end of the 2012 season.

Statistics

|-
|- style="background-color: #EAEAEA"
! scope="row" style="text-align:center" | 1998
|style="text-align:center;"|
| 6 || 9 || 3 || 3 || 83 || 44 || 127 || 27 || 12 || 0.3 || 0.3 || 9.2 || 4.9 || 14.1 || 3.0 || 1.3
|-
! scope="row" style="text-align:center" | 1999
|style="text-align:center;"|
| 6 || 16 || 17 || 15 || 157 || 76 || 233 || 42 || 22 || 1.1 || 0.9 || 9.8 || 4.8 || 14.6 || 2.6 || 1.4
|- style="background-color: #EAEAEA"
! scope="row" style="text-align:center" | 2000
|style="text-align:center;"|
| 6 || 22 || 52 || 19 || 260 || 136 || 396 || 70 || 47 || 2.4 || 0.9 || 11.8 || 6.2 || 18.0 || 3.2 || 2.1
|-
! scope="row" style="text-align:center;" | 2001
|style="text-align:center;"|
| 6 || 15 || 16 || 17 || 131 || 64 || 195 || 41 || 27 || 1.1 || 1.1 || 8.7 || 4.3 || 13.0 || 2.7 || 1.8
|- style="background-color: #EAEAEA"
! scope="row" style="text-align:center;" | 2002
|style="text-align:center;"|
| 6 || 22 || 19 || 10 || 253 || 129 || 382 || 78 || 60 || 0.9 || 0.5 || 11.5 || 5.9 || 17.4 || 3.5 || 2.7
|-
! scope="row" style="text-align:center;" | 2003
|style="text-align:center;"|
| 6 || 26 || 27 || 12 || 349 || 190 || 539 || 120 || 72 || 1.0 || 0.5 || 13.4 || 7.3 || 20.7 || 4.6 || 2.8
|- style="background-color: #EAEAEA"
! scope="row" style="text-align:center" | 2004
|style="text-align:center;"|
| 6 || 24 || 15 || 14 || 364 || 169 || 533 || 90 || 78 || 0.6 || 0.6 || 15.2 || 7.0 || 22.2 || 3.8 || 3.3
|-
! scope="row" style="text-align:center" | 2005
|style="text-align:center;"|
| 6 || 20 || 12 || 9 || 314 || 131 || 445 || 88 || 65 || 0.6 || 0.5 || 15.7 || 6.6 || 22.3 || 4.4 || 3.3
|- style="background-color: #EAEAEA"
! scope="row" style="text-align:center" | 2006
|style="text-align:center;"|
| 6 || 22 || 15 || 7 || 376 || 185 || 561 || 106 || 81 || 0.7 || 0.3 || 17.1 || 8.4 || 25.5 || 4.8 || 3.7
|-
! scope="row" style="text-align:center" | 2007
|style="text-align:center;"|
| 6 || 19 || 9 || 8 || 246 || 206 || 452 || 65 || 96 || 0.5 || 0.4 || 12.9 || 10.8 || 23.8 || 3.4 || 5.1
|- style="background-color: #EAEAEA"
! scope="row" style="text-align:center" | 2008
|style="text-align:center;"|
| 6 || 22 || 7 || 8 || 286 || 256 || 542 || 73 || 100 || 0.3 || 0.4 || 13.0 || 11.6 || 24.6 || 3.3 || 4.5
|-
! scope="row" style="text-align:center" | 2009
|style="text-align:center;"|
| 6 || 24 || 6 || 6 || 307 || 308 || 615 || 94 || 121 || 0.3 || 0.3 || 12.8 || 12.8 || 25.6 || 3.9 || 5.0
|- style="background-color: #EAEAEA"
! scope="row" style="text-align:center" | 2010
|style="text-align:center;"|
| 6 || 21 || 9 || 4 || 269 || 212 || 481 || 84 || 79 || 0.4 || 0.2 || 12.8 || 10.1 || 22.9 || 4.0 || 3.8
|-
! scope="row" style="text-align:center" | 2011
|style="text-align:center;"|
| 6 || 20 || 19 || 9 || 191 || 192 || 383 || 61 || 80 || 1.0 || 0.5 || 9.6 || 9.6 || 19.2 || 3.1 || 4.0
|- style="background-color: #EAEAEA"
! scope="row" style="text-align:center" | 2012
|style="text-align:center;"|
| 6 || 20 || 0 || 1 || 227 || 182 || 409 || 84 || 52 || 0.0 || 0.1 || 11.4 || 9.1 || 20.5 || 4.2 || 2.6
|- class="sortbottom"
! colspan=3| Career
! 302
! 226
! 142
! 3813
! 2480
! 6293
! 1123
! 992
! 0.7
! 0.5
! 12.6
! 8.2
! 20.8
! 3.7
! 3.3
|}

Honours and achievements
Team
AFL Premiership (Brisbane Lions): 2001, 2002, 2003
Individual
All-Australian: 2004
Brisbane Lions A.F.C. Co-Captain: 2007–2008
AFL Players’ Association Madden Medal: 2012

Coaching career

Greater Western Sydney
Shortly after his retirement from his playing career, Power then became an assistant coach with Greater Western Sydney Giants in their second AFL season in the 2013 season. Power served in this capacity for five seasons.

AFL Academy High Performance coach
In 2017, Power became the AFL Academy High Performance coach, leading the Underage national team to consecutive victories against New Zealand in 2017,2018 and 2019.

Carlton Football Club
In September 2019, Power then became an assistant coach at Carlton Football Club in the position of Head of Development, with the primary responsibility being to manage the players' performance and development. However in the middle of the 2021 season, fellow Carlton assistant coach John Barker departed the club because of an external review the club had decided to undertake, to improve its on-field results. Power then replaced Barker to be promoted to a higher assistant coaching position within the Carlton Football Club as the stoppages coach.  

In 2021, Power won the AFL’s Assistant Coach of the Year at the AFL Coaches Association awards.

In 2022, Power was made Head Coach of Carlton's reserves team, which are competing in the VFL.

References

External links

Brisbane Lions - Official Profile of Luke Power

Brisbane Lions players
Brisbane Lions Premiership players
Brisbane Lions captains
Greater Western Sydney Giants players
1980 births
Living people
All-Australians (AFL)
Australian rules footballers from Melbourne
Oakleigh Chargers players
People educated at Trinity Grammar School, Kew
Australia international rules football team players
Three-time VFL/AFL Premiership players